is a railway station on the Hokuhoku Line in the city of Tōkamachi, Niigata, Japan, operated by the third-sector rail operator Hokuetsu Express.

Lines

Station layout
The station has a single ground-level side platform serving one bi-directional track. The station is unattended.

Adjacent stations

History
Shinza Station opened on 22 March 1997.

Passenger statistics
In fiscal 2011, the station was used by an average of 102 passengers daily.

Surrounding area
 Tōkamachi Elementary School
 Tōkamachi Junior High School

See also
 List of railway stations in Japan

References

External links

  

Railway stations in Niigata Prefecture
Railway stations in Japan opened in 1997
Stations of Hokuetsu Express
Tōkamachi, Niigata